The 2007-08 season of the Saudi Professional League was the 32nd season of top-tier football in Saudi Arabia.

Teams and venues

League standings

Season statistics

Top scorers

References

2007–08 in Asian association football leagues
2007–08 in Saudi Arabian football
Saudi Premier League seasons